Heretic II is a dark fantasy action-adventure game developed by Raven Software and published by Activision in 1998 continuing the story of Corvus, the main character from its predecessor, Heretic. It is the fourth game in the Hexen: Beyond Heretic series and comes after the "Serpent Rider" trilogy. Although Id Software owns the publishing rights to the previous titles, Heretic 2 is owned by Activision since they own Raven Software and its IPs.

Using a modified Quake II engine, the game features a mix of a third-person camera with a first-person shooter's action, making for a new gaming experience at the time. While progressive, this was a controversial design decision among fans of the original game, a well-known first-person shooter built on the Doom engine. The music was composed by Kevin Schilder. Gerald Brom contributed conceptual work to characters and creatures for the game. This is the only Heretic/Hexen video game that is unrelated to id Software, apart from its role as engine licenser.

Heretic II was later ported to Linux by Loki Software, to the Amiga by Hyperion Entertainment, and Macintosh by MacPlay.

Plot
After Corvus returns from his banishment, he finds that a mysterious plague has swept the land of Parthoris, taking the sanity of those it does not kill. Corvus, the protagonist of the first game, is forced to flee his hometown of Silverspring after the infected attack him, but not before he is infected himself. The effects of the disease are held at bay in Corvus’ case because he holds one of the Tomes of Power, but he still must find a cure before he succumbs.

His quest leads him through the city and swamps to a jungle palace, then through a desert canyon and insect hive, followed by a dark network of mines and finally to a castle on a high mountain where he finds an ancient Seraph named Morcalavin. Morcalavin is trying to reach immortality using the seven Tomes of Power, but he uses a false tome, as Corvus has one of them. This has caused Morcalavin to go insane and create the plague. During a battle between Corvus and Morcalavin, Corvus switches the false tome for his real one, curing Morcalavin's insanity and ending the plague.

Gameplay
Unlike previous games in the Heretic/Hexen series, which were first-person shooters, players control Corvus from a camera fixed behind him in the third-person perspective. Players are able to use a combination of both melee and ranged attacks, similar to its predecessor. While there are still three weapons the player can collect that each use their own ammo, they also have the ability to use several offensive and defensive spells that draw from pools of green and blue mana, respectively. The Tome of Power is no longer an item scattered around the levels, but a defensive spell that still works in the same manner as the other games in the series by improving damage and granting weapons and offensive spells new abilities for a limited time. Melee combat is also more varied, with the ability to perform several attacks using Corvus' bladestaff and cut off the limbs of enemies, rendering them harmless. Players are also able to utilize magical shrines throughout the game that grant a variety of effects upon use, such as silver or gold armor, a temporary boost in health, a permanent enhancement to the bladestaff, etc.

The game consists of a wide variety of high fantasy medieval backdrops to Corvus's adventure. The third-person perspective and three-dimensional game environment allowed developers to introduce a wide variety of gymnastic moves, like climbing up ledges, back-flipping off walls, and pole vaulting, in a much more dynamic environment than the original game's engine could produce. Both games invite comparison with their respective game engine namesake: the original Heretic was built on the Doom engine, and Heretic II was built using the Quake II engine, later known as id Tech 2. Heretic II was favorably received at release because it took a different approach to its design.

Development
The game was in development since November 1997 by a team of 20 people. Inspired by the Tomb Raider series, Raven Software decided to make use of the Quake II engine to create a third-person action game. A major step in the early development was Gerald Brom's concept art. In a month, the company had programmed the game's camera system. After Activision's approval of the game's demo, Raven Software aimed to get the full game finished by Christmas (it would release just prior to that Thanksgiving). To add to complications, they needed a software renderer to make the game playable to 16-bit users (especially in Europe).

For the animation, the main character Corvus was provided with a backbone for realism and had a total of 1600 frames. Most of the animations were done using Softimage. The static world objects and simplified animations were done with 3D Studio Max. The engine was capable of showing up to 4,000 polygons on screen.

Following ZeniMax Media's acquisition of id Software in 2009, the rights to the series have been disputed between both id and Raven Software; Raven holds the development rights, while id holds the publishing rights to Heretic II'''s predecessors.

ReceptionHeretic II was a commercial flop. According to PC Data, its sales in the United States totaled 28,994 units by April 1999. Activision's Steve Felsen blamed this performance on the game's design: he noted that "fans of first-person shooters—the target audience for this game—stayed away due to the third-person perspective".Next Generation reviewed the PC version of the game, rating it three stars out of five, and stated that "Heretic II has a lot going for it. It easily earns it space on the shelf with the heavy hitters this season, but it also serves as a reminder to all that every aspect of game design needs to be pushed if you want your project to truly stand out".Edge praised the game for its mixture of platform and shoot 'em up action, saying that Heretic II is different enough to stand out from both first-person and third-person games like id Software's first-person shooters or Core Design's Tomb Raider games. Heretic II was a finalist for Computer Gaming Worlds 1998 "Best Action" award, which ultimately went to Battlezone. The editors wrote that Heretic II "proved that the Quake II engine could work in a third-person game and'' that a spell-casting, shirtless elf could actually kick ass".

References

External links
Official website via Internet Archive

1998 video games
Action-adventure games
Activision games
Amiga games
AmigaOS 4 games
Classic Mac OS games
Cooperative video games
Dark fantasy video games
Heretic and Hexen
Id Tech games
Linux games
Loki Entertainment games
MorphOS games
Multiplayer and single-player video games
Raven Software games
Video game sequels
Video games about diseases
Windows games
Video games developed in the United States